Rader Creek is a census-designated place (CDP) in Jefferson County, Montana, United States. The population was 363 at the 2010 census.

Geography
The CDP is in southwestern Jefferson County and is sparsely settled. An unincorporated place named Nineteen Mile is along Montana Highway 2 in the western part of the CDP, and Cactus Junction, at the intersection of MT 2 and MT 41, is at the eastern border of the CDP. MT 2 (former U.S. Route 10) leads east  to Whitehall and northwest  to Butte, while MT 41 leads south  to Twin Bridges.

Rader Creek, the community's namesake, flows out of mountains to the northwest near the Continental Divide, joining Little Pipestone Creek in the east part of the CDP. The creeks are part of the Jefferson River watershed, eventually flowing to the Missouri River.

Demographics

References

Census-designated places in Jefferson County, Montana
Census-designated places in Montana